The 1999 Oregon Ducks football team represented the University of Oregon during the 1999 NCAA Division I-A football season. They were led by head coach Mike Bellotti, who was in his 5th season as head coach of the Ducks. They played their home games at Autzen Stadium in Eugene, Oregon and participated as members of the Pacific-10 Conference.

Schedule

Rankings

Roster

Game summaries

Michigan State

UTEP

Nevada

USC

Washington

UCLA

Arizona

Arizona State

Washington State

California

Oregon State

Sun Bowl

References

Oregon
Oregon Ducks football seasons
Sun Bowl champion seasons
Oregon Ducks football